Trybomia is a genus of thrips in the family Phlaeothripidae.

Species
 Trybomia brevitubus
 Trybomia cesari
 Trybomia elongata
 Trybomia gossypii
 Trybomia intermedia
 Trybomia mendesi

References

Phlaeothripidae
Thrips
Thrips genera